Mount Lepus is a large rocky massif separated into two distinct sections by a deep saddle, standing between Millett Glacier and Bertram Glacier, about  east of Wade Point on the west coast of Palmer Land, Antarctica. It was named by the UK Antarctic Place-Names Committee after the constellation of Lepus.

References

Mountains of Palmer Land